Arpana Agrawal is a psychiatric geneticist and professor of psychiatry at Washington University School of Medicine, known for researching the roles of genetic and environmental factors in cannabis use and addiction. She also serves as Co-Chair of the Psychiatric Genomics Consortium working group on Substance Use Disorders. In 2018, she received the Theodore Reich Young Investigator Award from the International Society of Psychiatric Genetics. She also received the Fuller/Scott Award from the Behavioral Genetics Association in 2010 and the Henri Begleiter Excellence in Research Award from the Research Society on Alcohol in 2022.

References

External links
Faculty profile

Psychiatric geneticists
Living people
Virginia Commonwealth University alumni
Washington University School of Medicine faculty
Year of birth missing (living people)
Women psychiatrists